Cebrella is a genus of butterflies in the family Lycaenidae. The genus was erected by John Nevill Eliot and Akito Kawazoe in 1983.

Species
Subgenus Cebrella
Cebrella pellecebra (Frühstorfer, 1910) Thailand, Malay Peninsula, Sumatra
Cebrella penelope Eliot & Kawazoé, 1983 Philippines (Mindanao)
Subgenus Chelakina Eliot & Kawazoé, 1984
Cebrella malanga (Chapman, 1911) Borneo
Cebrella nigerrima (Moulton, 1911) Borneo, Pahang
Cebrella lingga (Moulton, 1912) Sarawak

External links

 With images.

 
Lycaenidae genera